Vilson is a masculine given name. Notable people with the name include:

Vilson Ahmeti (born 1951), Albanian politician
Vilson Caković (born 1991), Serbian footballer
Vilson Džoni (born 1950), Croatian footballer
Vilson (Brazilian footballer) (born 1988), Brazilian footballer

Masculine given names